The Braford is a cross between a Hereford bull and a Brahman cow. Conversely, it can also be a cross between a Brahman bull and a Hereford cow.  The make up of the Braford is 3/8 Brahman and 5/8 Hereford.  Even though a true Braford meets those standards, 1/2 Brahman and 1/2 Hereford cross are known as F1 Brafords or F1 Baldies. They carry the characteristics of both parents.  The Braford is red like a Hereford with white underbelly, head, and feet.  It is stockier than a Hereford, though, getting the stockiness from the Brahman.

The Braford is primarily used for beef, but sometimes used for rodeo. Brafords were developed both in Australia in 1946 and in Florida in 1947. There are two lines of pure Braford, Australian and American Braford.

Brafords have heat and insect resistance because of the increased number of sweat glands and oily skin inherited from their Brahman heritage.  They have been known to be of an ornery disposition, though this may be due to their raising, any predisposition toward being difficult is still a subject of debate.  They are often used in Rodeos due to their massive bulk and bone density, hardiness, heat endurance, and arguably their ornery disposition.  They do well in warm climates though they have been raised in northern climates and seem to do well there as well, likely due to their great bulk.

See also
Australian Braford

References
John Pukite- "A Field Guide to Cows", 
United Braford Breeders 

Cattle breeds
Cattle breeds originating in the United States